Tony Englebert (born 18 December 1961) is a former Belgian footballer.

Honours

Club 
Standard Liège

 Belgian First Division: 1981–82, 1982–83
 Belgian Cup: 1980–81
 Belgian Super Cup: 1981
 Belgian League Cup: 1975
 European Cup Winners' Cup: 1981-82 (runners-up)
 Intertoto Cup Group Winners: 1980, 1982

References 

Living people
1961 births
Belgian footballers
Standard Liège players
Association footballers not categorized by position